Kate Mayhew (September 2, 1853 – June 16, 1944) was an American stage actress. Her earliest stage appearance may have been in one of the starring companies of M'Liss in the 1870s, made famous by Annie Pixley. In the 1890s, she appeared in Oriental parts. She was long on Broadway in support of most of the well-known names and made a few films. One of her last Broadway appearances was in the 1934 stage production of The Farmer Takes a Wife with Henry Fonda and June Walker.

She was born in Indianapolis, Indiana and died in New York aged 90.

Selected filmography
Tongues of Flame (1924)

References

External links

portrait gallery(NY Public Library, Billy Rose collection)

1853 births
1944 deaths
Actresses from Indianapolis
19th-century American actresses
American stage actresses
20th-century American actresses